Stutz is a 2022 documentary film directed by Jonah Hill. The film chronicles the life and career of psychiatrist  Dr. Phil Stutz, Hill's therapist.

In August 2022, Hill revealed that he would not be promoting any of his upcoming work, including Stutz, to protect himself from anxiety attacks. The film began streaming on Netflix on 14 November 2022.

Premise 
In a series of conversations, Jonah Hill and his therapist Phil Stutz delve into their life stories and mental health, their approach to therapy, and Stutz's doctor-patient relationships.

Reception 
On the review aggregator website Rotten Tomatoes, the film holds an approval rating of 100% based on 20 reviews. On Metacritic, the film has a weighted average score of 76 out of 100, based on five critics, indicating "generally favorable reviews".

Lisa Kennedy of The New York Times gave Stutz a positive review and described it as "a film that skillfully navigates vulnerability, brainy insights and artistry". Noel Murray of the Los Angeles Times also gave the film a generally positive review, referring to it as "a simple but emotionally affecting documentary" and as a "a candid look at Hill’s self-doubts as a person and an artist." He concludes his review by acknowledging the film's that Stutz has a worthy goal, "changing the perspectives of people who might be hurting right now" and that "for those willing to go with its flow, it has a real power".

Rick Allen of RogerEbert.com gave Stutz three out of four stars. In his review, he criticizes the beginning of film, describing it as "intriguing but stuffy" and "too much in its head" and notes that the editing was "distracting". Allen then states that  "as a formal experimentation by an actor whose filmmaking talents are only the latest chapter in his Hollywood story, the documentary offers a touching reflection on Jonah Hill, The Star."

David Ehrlich of IndieWire gave the movie a B. He describes it as "a strange and poignant documentary about his therapist unfolds like a cross between "The Rehearsal" and a self-help tape". Ehrlich states that "whatever else this movie becomes, it always remains a heartfelt tribute from one celebrity to his favorite shrink" and notes that Stutz "is more for him [Hill] than it is for us".

Psychotherapist James Davies called the film a "fascinating and engaging watch" but noted that he didn't think that "watching a documentary - and temporarily adopting some of its suggestions - will ever be a replacement for good, long-term, in-person therapy".

References

External links 
 
 
 

2022 films
Films about mental health
2022 documentary films